Lepidochrysops negus is a butterfly in the family Lycaenidae. It is found in Sudan and Ethiopia.

The wingspan is 40 mm for males and 42–45 mm for females. The upperside of both wings of the males is pale violet sublustrous blue with dark marks closing the cells. The forewings have a row of terminal brown spots preceded by a submarginal series of brown lunules. The hindwings have a similar terminal and submarginal pattern. The underside of both wings is greyish white with pale brownish spots and markings edged with white. The upperside of both wings of the females is brownish with a slight irroration (sprinkling) of blue scales.  The forewings have a confluent brown broad terminal stripe, with a fine pale internal line separating it from the submarginal row of broad internervular dashes. The hindwings have a terminal row of subspherical spots preceded by a row of lunules. The underside is precisely as in males.

Subspecies
 Lepidochrysops negus negus (Ethiopia)
 Lepidochrysops negus wau (Wichgraf, 1921) (eastern Sudan)

References

Butterflies described in 1865
Lepidochrysops
Butterflies of Africa
Taxa named by Baron Cajetan von Felder
Taxa named by Rudolf Felder